Gordon Fullerton Gibson,  (born 1937) is a political columnist, author, and politician in British Columbia (BC), Canada.  He is the son of the late Gordon Gibson, who was a prominent businessman and Liberal Party politician in British Columbia in the 1950s.

He received a BA (Honours) in mathematics and physics at the University of British Columbia and an MBA from Harvard Business School, and he did research work at the London School of Economics.

Gibson served as an assistant to the federal Minister of Northern Affairs from 1963 to 1968, and was a special assistant to Prime Minister Pierre Trudeau from 1968 to 1972. In the 1972 federal election, he ran as the Liberal candidate in Vancouver South, but lost to Progressive Conservative candidate John Fraser by 3,000 votes.

In 1974, Gibson won a by-election to the Legislative Assembly of British Columbia in the riding of North Vancouver-Capilano under the Liberal banner.  The following year, three Liberal MLAs  defected to the Social Credit Party three months before that year's general election,  leaving Gibson and party leader David Anderson as the only two Liberals in the legislature.  Anderson declined to be renominated to the leadership, and Gibson was approached to lead the party into the election. He was the only Liberal elected that year.  He remained party leader until 1979, when he resigned to run again for a seat in the federal House of Commons, in the riding of North Vancouver-Burnaby. He was defeated in both the 1979 and 1980 federal elections by Progressive Conservative candidate Chuck Cook by less than 2,000 votes on each attempt.

He attempted to return to politics as a candidate in the 1993 B.C. Liberal leadership convention; he came in second to future Premier Gordon Campbell.

Gibson has been a senior fellow in Canadian Studies at the Fraser Institute since 1993, and has written several books on Canadian federalism and governance.  Following the 2001 provincial election, he was hired by the government to make recommendations on the structure and mandate of the Citizens' Assembly on Electoral Reform. His report was substantially adopted.

His columns appear frequently in the Vancouver Sun, Winnipeg Free Press and The Globe and Mail.

In May 2008, Gibson was awarded the Order of British Columbia.

Writings
A New Look at Canadian Indian Policy: Respect the Collective - Promote the Individual (2009).

References 
 Fraser Institute Biography

Leaders of the British Columbia Liberal Party
British Columbia Liberal Party MLAs
Canadian columnists
Harvard Business School alumni
Candidates in the 1972 Canadian federal election
Candidates in the 1979 Canadian federal election
Candidates in the 1980 Canadian federal election
1937 births
Living people
Alumni of the London School of Economics
Members of the Order of British Columbia
University of British Columbia alumni
Liberal Party of Canada candidates for the Canadian House of Commons